Afghan Film also known as Afghan Film Organization (AFO) is Afghanistan's state-run film company, established in 1968. The current president is Sahraa Karimi, who attained a PhD in Cinema from the Academy of Performing Arts in Bratislava and is its first female president.

It is also a film archive. Many of its contents were destroyed by the Taliban, although some staff members saved valuable films risking their own lives. A number of rescue and archival efforts were chronicled in the 2015 documentary A Flickering Truth. An eight-day film festival was launched on August 3, 2019, showcasing 100 films around different cinemas in the country in celebration of the country's 100th anniversary of independence.

In 2019, the documentary The Forbidden Reel, which details the history of Afghan Cinema through interviews and archives was released. Directed by Afghan-Canadian filmmaker, Ariel Nasr, the film premiered internationally at IDFA 2019, and won the Rogers Audience Award at Hot Docs 2020.

See also
 Cinema of Afghanistan
 List of film archives

References

External links
 https://web.archive.org/web/20160304023402/http://www.afghanmagazine.com/2004_07/photoessay/afghanfilm.shtml
 

Cinema of Afghanistan
Film archives in Asia
Archives in Afghanistan
Mass media companies established in 1968
1968 establishments in Afghanistan